Advaita Vedanta is a school of Hindu philosophy and religious practice.

Advaita or Adwaita may also refer to:
 Advaita (band), a New Delhi-based Indian fusion band
 Advaita (festival), a festival of the Indian Institute of Technology, Bhubaneswar
 Adwaita, a giant tortoise at Alipore Zoological Gardens
Advaitha (actress), Indian actress
 Adwaita Mallabarman (1914–1951), Bengali writer

See also
 Advaita Ashrama
 Kashmir Shaivism
 Neo-Advaita
 Neo-Vedanta
 Nondualism
 Shiva Advaita